Carlos Bertram Clarke  (7 April 1918  – 14 October 1993) was a West Indian international cricketer who played in three Test matches in 1939. During the war when three-day cricket was an impossibility due to the demands of labour for the military, Clarke was the leading bowler for the British Empire XI which played one-day matches across the country. He took 98 wickets for 11.48 runs apiece in 1941 and bettered this with 129 for 10.17 apiece in 1942.

A fine leg-spinner, he was for a time a guest of the Queen, after which, according to an admiring Leo Cooper, he returned “the same as ever and continued to weave his spells over a host of club cricketers”.

After the war, Clarke played frequently though not regularly for Northamptonshire in 1946 and 1947, and much later for Essex in 1959 and 1960.

References

External links

1918 births
1993 deaths
West Indies Test cricketers
Barbadian cricketers
Barbados cricketers
Essex cricketers
Northamptonshire cricketers
Marylebone Cricket Club cricketers